Hanns Wolf (sometimes incorrectly called Hans Wolf; June 7, 1894 – July 2, 1968) was a post-romantic and modern composer, pianist and music professor; nearly all his works were destroyed after World War II. Due to this, Wolf was nearly forgotten until 1996 when he was rediscovered by Karl Urlberger.

Biography 

Hanns Wolf was born in Bamberg, Germany. Little is known about his childhood, however from 1908 to 1912, he studied under Max Meyer-Olbersleben for composition and Henryk van Zeyl (who was a student of Liszt) for piano in the Würzburg Music Conservatory.

From 1912 to 1924 he was a teacher for piano and organ, first in Essen as a private piano teacher from the year 1912 to 1913, then in Aschaffenburg as a teacher of piano and organ in the Städtische Musikschule Aschaffenburg (municipal music school), starting as a permanent teacher from February 1914 to 1924. In Aschaffenburg, Wolf was considerably popular and well known as he and Hermann Kundigraber (who was the head of the music school) organized many concerts that can be date backed as early as 1917. Wolf taught piano to Ottmar Geißler (Geissler).

After 1924, Wolf was a professor in the Augsburg Musikhochschule, now known as Leopold Mozart Centre of the University of Augsburg. Wolf also played piano around Europe, playing the works of Dobrowen and Wladigeroff. However, the outbreak of World War II forced him to stay in Germany. He continued to hold his position as a professor in the university until the war ended in 1945, when he resigned as a professor and lived as an independent composer and pianist.

He died at the age of 74 on July 2, 1968 in Füssen, Germany.

Compositions, works and performances 
A majority of his work has been destroyed or lost, this reason most likely was political, but it is still uncertain. As a pianist, he performed with Otto Klemperer, Georg Ludwig Jochum, and Eduard van Beinum.

His compositions were mostly piano related.

Compositions 
 Piano Concerto in C-sharp minor (1929)
 "Serious and Joking" Ernst und Scherz 10 piano pieces (1930)
 "Light music" Leichte Spielmusik 10 small piano pieces for youth
 Étude in E minor “Springbrunnen”
 Paraphrase for the piano on "Wiener Blut" by Johann Strauss II
 5 Franconian Dances for four hands (~1935)
 4 Peasant Dances for strings
 Piano rearrangement of a Minuet by Leopold Mozart (1937)
 Prof. Mannheim (1934)
 Twelve variations on a minuet by Johann Christian Fischer KV 179, (A rewrite of the original variations by Mozart, this work was originally started by Alfred Hoffmiller of the Augsburg music school; 1940s?)

Rediscovery and recordings
In 1996, Karl Urlberger reintroduced Hanns Wolf to the world, recording five of Wolf's pieces (listed below) in 1997 under the •K•U• Classics (Aschaffenburg) label. While the 4 Peasant Dances were also released on "For strings only" CD that includes Moritz Moszkowski's Prelude and Fugue Op. 85, Alec Rowley's English Dance Suite, Richard Trunk's Serenade for strings Op. 55, George Enescu's two intermezzi for strings, Op. 12, and Constantin Silvestri 3 pieces for string orchestra, Op. 4, No. 2. All the recordings were made in Romania.

Piano concerto
The piano concerto was probably composed in 1929, it known to be performed as early as 1935 in Coburg by the Coburg Gesellschaft der Musikfreunde. Another performance was given on 21 July 1938, in a music program including Hector Berlioz's Roman Carnival overture, and Tchaikovsky's 6th Symphony, in this performance Hanns Wolf was the pianist. Due to World War II, the piece wasn't performed again until 60 years later on 17 January 1997, when it was performed and recorded with pianist Dana Borsan and the National Radio Orchestra of Romania conducted by Ludovic Bács. Karl Urlberger organized and helped the performance by bringing the sheet music.

On 8 September 2011, in the 2011 George Enescu Festival, Dana Borsan again performed the piano concerto, but with the "Moldova" Philharmonic Orchestra conducted by Sébastian Rouland. This performance was recorded, and was published on YouTube on 25 April 2013, thus making Wolf more well-known.

Other
In Box 16 (1927) of the Ernst Henschel collection, there might be a recording of Hanns Wolf's piano recital dated 1 October 1927.

Hanns Wolf was recognized in Peter Hollfelder's Lexikon Klaviermusik in 2005.

Wolf's piano concerto was mentioned in Paul D. Escudero's Pluto II: Voyage to the end of the Universe when Greg listened to it to achieve a "Hemi-Sync Reality" during meditation.

Notes

References 

German composers
1894 births
1968 deaths